Geoffrey II of Villehardouin (c. 1195- after May 6, 1246) was the third prince of Achaea (c. 1229-1246). From his accession to the princely throne, he was a powerful and respected person, and even French knights came to the principality to enter his service. Geoffrey II emerged as the most powerful vassal of the Latin Empire of Constantinople, the person around whom the crusaders' states in modern Greece gradually regrouped themselves. He came to the rescue of the imperial capital three times. As a reward of his services to the Latin Empire, he was granted suzerainty over the island of Euboea by his brother-in-law, Emperor Baldwin II of Constantinople (1228–1261). He was also a humane prince, benevolent and just, solicitous for the condition of the common people.

Early years 
Geoffrey was born as the eldest son of Geoffrey of Villehardouin, a French knight from Champagne and his wife, Elisabeth of Chappes. His father joined the Fourth Crusade in 1199, later conquered a significant part of the Peloponnese and seized the throne of the Principality of Achaea following the death of its first prince, William I (1205–1209).

The new prince summoned his wife from Champagne during the early period of his residence in the Peloponnese. She came with their young son, Geoffrey and the family took up its residence in the castles of La Crémonie (now Sparta, Greece) and Kalamata.

In 1217 the young Geoffrey married Agnes, the daughter of Emperor Peter I of Constantinople (1217).

His reign 
Geoffrey II succeeded his father at the age of about 35. He lived in a noble style, keeping always at his court 80 knights with golden spurs, supported on his bounty.

He began his reign during a very critical period in the history of the Latin Empire of Constantinople, because the fall of the Kingdom of Thessalonica in 1224 had interposed formidable enemies between the capital of the empire on the one hand and the crusaders' states in the Peloponnese on the other. But the defeat of Emperor Theodore Komnenos Doukas of Thessalonica (c. 1225-1230) by Tzar Ivan Asen II of Bulgaria (1218–1241) at Klokotnitza in April, 1230 freed them from the dangers inherent in the great concentration of power in the hand of Theodore Komnenos Doukas.

Living on good terms with his Greek neighbors, Geoffrey II assured the peace and prosperity of his principality. He frequently sent investigators to the courts of the barons to inform him of their way of life and of the manner in which they treated their vassals.

His resources permitted him to send financial aid to his liege lord Emperor John I of Constantinople (1231–1237). In 1236 he intervened in person to succor Constantinople, besieged by the forces of the Greek Emperor John III Vatatzes of Nicaea (1222–1254). With a fleet manned by 100 knights, 300 crossbow-men, and 500 archers, he forced the blockade and then, in conjunction with the Venetians, Pisans, and Genoese, repulsed the Greek fleet and delivered the capital. In the same year, Count Maio I Orsini of Cephalonia (1194–1238) placed himself under Geoffrey II's suzerainty. In July 1237 he gave the Teutonic Knights a hospital in Andravida.

In 1238, uniting his ships with those of Venice, he again came to the rescue of Constantinople, once more besieged by the emperor of Nicaea. In the following year, Geoffrey II wished to take part in the crusade of his overlord of France, Count Theobald IV of Champagne (1201–1253), but Pope Gregory IX ordered him to turn his forces against the Greek emperor in order to ensure the safety of Constantinople. On February 9, 1240, the pope granted him an indulgence to the effect that the vow he had made of going as a crusader to the Holy Land might be fulfilled, with all benefits, by rendering continued assistance to the beleaguered Latin Empire.

In 1243, upon the false rumor of the death of his brother-in-law, Emperor Baldwin II of Constantinople (1228–1261), Geoffrey II returned to the capital of the empire in order to secure the regency during the minority of his wife's nephew, Philip.

Geoffrey II died in 1246 and was buried in his capital, Andravida, in the church of the monastery of St. Jacob.

Footnotes

See also
Principality of Achaea
Chronicle of Morea

References

External links
Finley jr, John H.: Corinth in the Middle Ages. Speculum, Vol. 7, No. 4. 1932, pp. 477-499.
Tozer, H. F.: The Franks in the Peloponnese. The Journal of Hellenic Studies, Vol. 4. (1883), pp. 165-236.

1195 births
1246 deaths
Christians of the Crusades
Villehardouin family
Princes of Achaea
Burials at the Church and Hospice of St. James (Andravida)
13th-century people from the Principality of Achaea